Dynamic replication may refer to:

 Dynamic replication (finance)
 Data grid#Dynamic replication